Archimandrite Kyprianos (1735 – 1803 est.) was a cleric, historian, poet, and publishing editor. He was one of the major Greek Cypriot intellectuals and clerics of the 18th century. 

He was born in the village of Kilani in the Limassol District. He started his career in the church as a deacon in the Cypriot Archbishopric. Later on as an Archimandrite he studied in Venice. While in Venice in 1780, he edited and wrote the introduction to Theophilos Korydaleus' treatise on Aristotle's On Generation and Corruption a work sponsored by Archbishop Chrysanthos and the Pafos bishop, Panaretos. In Venice, he also worked on correcting books published in the Greek language. He furthered his studies in Padova, and from 1794 to 1798, he was a senior cleric in the Greek Orthodox church of Trieste.

His most notable work is considered to be the Chronological history of Cyprus published in Venice in 1788. This book was subsequently published in four different editions.

References 
https://web.archive.org/web/20070609102044/http://libraries.theeuropeanlibrary.org/Cyprus/treasures_en.xml

1735 births
1803 deaths
Members of the Cypriot Orthodox Church
Christian writers
Cypriot non-fiction writers
Cypriot social scientists
Greek Cypriot people
Ottoman Cyprus
Archimandrites

Cypriot historians